The 2006 Women's Pan-American Volleyball Cup was the fifth edition of the annual women's volleyball tournament, played by twelve countries from June 27 to July 8, 2006 in the Coliseo Roberto Clemente in San Juan, Puerto Rico. The event served as a qualifier for the 2007 World Grand Prix in Ningbo, PR China. The winner of each pool automatically advanced to the semi-finals and the teams placed in second and third met in crossed matches in the quarterfinals round.

Competing nations

Squads

Preliminary round

Group A

Thursday June 29

Friday June 30

Saturday July 1

Sunday July 2

Monday July 3

Group B

Thursday June 29

Friday June 30

Saturday July 1

Sunday July 2

Monday July 3

Final round

Quarterfinals
Wednesday July 5, 2006

Semi-finals
Thursday July 6, 2006

Finals
Wednesday July 5, 2006 — Eleventh Place Match

Wednesday July 5, 2006 — Ninth Place Match

Thursday July 6, 2006 — Seventh Place Match

Thursday July 6, 2006 — Fifth Place Match

Friday July 7, 2006 — Bronze Medal Match

Friday July 7, 2006 — Gold Medal Match

Final ranking

Brazil, Cuba, Dominican Republic and the United States qualified for the 2007 World Grand Prix

Awards

Most Valuable Player
  Mari Steinbrecher

Best Attacker
  Mari Steinbrecher

Best Scorer
  Aury Cruz

Best Defender
  Yarleen Santiago

Best Setter
  Robyn Ah Mow-Santos
Best Server
  Aury Cruz

Best Receiver
  Stacey Gordon

Best Libero
  Arlene Xavier

Best Blocker
  Fabiana Claudino

Best Coach
  José Roberto Guimarães

References
 Results

Women's Pan-American Volleyball Cup
Pan-American Volleyball Cup
P
Volleyball